The Adventures of Swiss Family Robinson is a 1998 family adventure  series that originally aired on Pax.  Based on the 1812 novel The Swiss Family Robinson by Johann David Wyss, it follows the adventures of nine survivors of a shipwreck as they attempt to adapt to life on a deserted island.  It lasted for one season, with 10 three episode segments.

Background
This was the fifth television series based on the 1812 novel and followed nearly a dozen theatrical and made-for-television film versions.  Like many of these previous versions, it altered story lines and added several members to the cast of characters.

Broadcast
The show contained 10 story arcs of three episodes each and aired on closely spaced dates over seven weeks in September and October 1998.  It was one of the first shows broadcast on the newly formed PAX network.

It was also aired on Sri Lanka National Television dubbed in Sinhala language under the title  ("රොබින්සන් අන්දරය").

Cast and characters
Richard Thomas as David Robinson
Margo Gunn as Elizabeth Robinson
Kieren Hutchison as Ernst Robinson
Charlotte Woollams as Joanna Robinson
Mia Koning as Christina Robinson
Chantelle Yee as Emily Chen
K.C. Kelly as Jed Parsons
Gareth Howell as Ben Thomas
Junior Chile as Billy

Episodes
"Survival (Part 1)" (September 1, 1998)
"Survival (Part 2)" (September 2, 1998)
"Survival (Part 3)" (September 3, 1998)
"The Island of the Gods (Part 1)" (September 4, 1998)
"The Island of the Gods (Part 2)" (September 8, 1998)
"The Island of the Gods (Part 3)" (September 9, 1998)
"Invasion (Part 1)" (September 10, 1998)
"Invasion (Part 2)" (September 11, 1998)
"Invasion (Part 3)" (September 14, 1998)
"Princess From the Sea (Part 1)" (September 15, 1998)
"Princess From the Sea (Part 2)" (September 16, 1998)
"Princess From the Sea (Part 3)" (September 17, 1998)
"Captives (Part 1)" (September 20, 1998)
"Captives (Part 2)" (September 21, 1998)
"Captives (Part 3)" (September 22, 1998)
"The Ghost of Raven Jones (Part 1)" (September 23, 1998)
"The Ghost of Raven Jones (Part 2)" (September 26, 1998)
"The Ghost of Raven Jones (Part 3)" (September 27, 1998)
"The Treasure Hunt (Part 1)" (September 28, 1998)
"The Treasure Hunt (Part 2)" (September 29, 1998)
"The Treasure Hunt (Part 3)" (October 2, 1998)
"Star-Crossed Lovers (Part 1)" (October 3, 1998)
"Star-Crossed Lovers (Part 2)" (October 4, 1998)
"Star-Crossed Lovers (Part 3)" (October 5, 1998)
"Paradise Lost (Part 1)" (October 8, 1998)
"Paradise Lost (Part 2)" (October 9, 1998)
"Paradise Lost (Part 3)" (October 10, 1998)
"Boston (Part 1)" (October 11, 1998)
"Boston (Part 2)" (October 14, 1998)
"Boston (Part 3)" (October 15, 1998)

Media information
Questar/Sunset Home Visual Entertainment (SHE) released a complete series DVD in 2005.

References

External links
 
The Adventures of Swiss Family Robinson (Official) at Facebook.com

1990s American drama television series
1998 American television series debuts
1998 American television series endings
Adventure television series
Period family drama television series
Television shows based on Swiss novels
American television shows based on children's books
Television series about families
The Swiss Family Robinson
Television series set on fictional islands